A New Empire is the fourth extended play by South Korean singer Ailee. It was released on October 5, 2016, by YMC Entertainment and distributed by LOEN Entertainment.

Background and release
On August 23, 2016, the digital song "If You" was pre-released, along with a music video for it.

On September 23, 2016, it was revealed that Ailee would make comeback in mid-October. On September 28, 2016, the trailer was released for the music video of song "Home" and it was announced that the album was to be released on October 5, 2016.

On October 5, 2016, the music video for "Home" and album were both released.

Track listing

Charts

Release history

References

2016 EPs
Ailee EPs
Korean-language EPs
Kakao M EPs
YMC Entertainment EPs